Jubilee Wood is located in Malden Rushett in the Royal Borough of Kingston upon Thames in London. It is divided into two parts, separated by an electricity sub-station. They are part of the 22 hectare 'Sixty Acre Wood and Jubilee Wood' Site of Metropolitan Importance for Nature Conservation, and the two hectare eastern wood, which is the only part which is publicly accessible, is also a Local Nature Reserve.

The wood was planted to celebrate Queen Victoria's Golden Jubilee in 1887. Trees include birch, pedunculate oak, ash and field maple.

Notes

References

External links

Nature reserves in the Royal Borough of Kingston upon Thames
Local nature reserves in Greater London